The Newspaper is a 2020 Sri Lankan Sinhala drama thriller film co-directed by Sarath Kothalawala and Kumara Thirimadura. It is produced by Bandula Gunawardane along with Ravindra Guruge and H.D. Premasiri. It stars both directors Kothalawala and Thirimadura in lead roles where Gihan Fernando, Dharmapriya Dias and Pubudu Chathuranga made supportive roles. Music composed by Gayathri Khemadasa.

A special screening of the film was held at the Savoy Premier Hall in Wellawatte on 29 June 2020. A special screening will be held on the 24 July 2020 at 4 pm at the Wilmax Cinema Hall in Anuradhapura. A special screening and dialogue of the film was held on the 3 September 2020 at the Savoy Premiere (Roxy) Cinema Hall, Wellawatte.

Plot
Guna is a kind hearted man who lives a righteous life with his mother without burdening the country. Their lives are turned upside down by  misinformation published on a newspaper. Guna and his family members are branded as terrorists by the villagers who read the newspaper. The villagers deciding to take the law into their own hands break Guna's limbs, sets fire to his house and drives his family out of the village. After this incident Guna is relegated to a homemade wheel chair and lives a poverty stricken life. Amongst the villagers he is only supported by his friend Luvis.

One day Guna comes across a piece of a news paper article at a market stall which declares his brother was unjustly blamed for the bombing of an army bus. Guna shows the piece of paper to his mother and the other villagers to free the family from the unjust abuse and hatred targeted towards them by the villagers. When shown the article, the villagers and the village council member mock Guna since the title of the newspaper is missing. Heeding to his mother's insistence, with the idea of getting the story published on the front page, Guna and Luvis come to Colombo. Throughout the course of their journey they become entangled by several obstacles, where every newspaper they visit refuses to correct the wrong news. Meanwhile, a young journalist Tharushi helps them in many ways, in the meantime, Luvis is put in jail after slapping editor in chief, Senarath Iddamalgoda of a certain newspaper company.

After getting bail, they again go to the newspaper company where Tharushi works, where they are told to get police clearance if they want their story published. Guna and Luvis come across a roberry and helps the Police to catch the robber. Afterwards the news spreads quickly to the gang leader, who starts a plan to frame and kill Guna and Luvis. Meanwhile, under the pressure of the Police chief, the newspaper editor agrees to publish the corrected story about Guna's brother. On their return journey back to their village, Guna is too slow and misses Luvis to catch the train at the Fort Station. Guna tells Luvis, that he will catch the next train. So Luvis gets on to the train headed back to the village. At the station Guna stumbles across an envelope packed with drugs, whilst Guna innocently tries to find the owner of the envelope he is shot and killed presumably by a gang member with the envelope still in his hand. When Luvis returns to the village, he comes across the dead body of Guna's mother, so he buries the body placing the corrected paper article on top of the grave. The next day, the headline of the newspaper cites a death of a drug dealer at the Fort, which was actually the death of innocent Guna.

Cast

Awards
The film received positive reviews from critics. The DVD of the film was released in the last week of December 2020 at the Sarasavi Bookshop premises at the One Galle Face Shopping Complex, Colombo. The film won the second best film in the Asian Cinema Competition at the 2022 Bengaluru International Film Festival (BIFFes). In May 2022, the film won the award for the Best Director at the 23rd Rainbow Film Festival in London.

The film has been nominated for the award for "Best Indian sub continental Film" among films from South Asian countries at the Indian Film Festival of Melbourne. In September 2022, Thirimadura and Kothalawala were awarded joint Best Actors at the 18th Kazan International Film Festival.

References

External links
 
 ජනපති-අගමැති වෙනුවෙන් ද නිවුස් පේපර් විශේෂ දැක්මක්
 "ද නිවුස් පේපර් " චිත්‍රපටය මුවාවෙන් බන්දුල ප්‍රමෝට් වෙනවා - කැෆේ
 ද නිවුස් පේපර්
 සිසු පඬුරු
 ද නිවුස් පේපර් සිනමාපටය අපේක්ෂකත්ව ප්‍රවර්ධන කටයුත්තක්ද?
 “ද නිවුස් පේපර්“ චිත්‍රපටය ජනපති, අගමැති නරඹයි

2020s Sinhala-language films
2020 films
Sri Lankan drama films
2020 drama films